The 1985 FIBA European Championship, commonly called FIBA EuroBasket 1985, was the 24th FIBA EuroBasket regional basketball championship, held by FIBA Europe.  It took place from 5 to 16 June 1985 in West Germany. The Soviet Union defeated Czechoslovakia in the final to win their fourteenth and final title.

Venues

Qualification
A total of twelve teams qualified for the tournament. To the top eight teams from the previous tournament, four more teams were granted berths via a qualifying tournament.

Top eight teams from Eurobasket 1983:

Top four teams from the qualifying stage:

Squads

Format
The teams were split in two groups of six teams each. The top four teams from each group advance to the quarterfinals. The winners in the knockout semifinals advance to the Final, and the losers figure in a third-place playoff.
The losers from the quarterfinals stage compete in a separate bracket to define places 5th through 8th in the final standings.
The fifth and sixth teams from each group competed in another bracket to define places 9th through 12th in the final standings.

Preliminary round

Group A
Times given below are in Central European Time (UTC+1).

|}

Group B

|}

Knockout stage

Championship bracket

Quarterfinals

Semifinals

Third place

Final

5th to 8th place

9th to 12th place

Awards

Final standings

References

External links
1985 European Championship for Men archive.FIBA.com.

1985
1984–85 in European basketball
International basketball competitions hosted by West Germany
1985 in West German sport
June 1985 sports events in Europe